The 2008 Ukrainian Amateur Cup was the thirteenth annual season of Ukraine's football knockout competition for amateur football teams. The competition started on 6 August 2008 and concluded on 8 November 2008.

Competition schedule
This year Luzhany, BRV-VIK V/V, Polissya Dobrianka, Irpin Horenychi, Yednist-2 Plysky, and Torpedo Mykolaiv received a bye to the second round (1/8 finals).

First round (1/16)

Second round (1/8)

Quarterfinals (1/4)

Semifinals (1/2)

Final

See also
 2008 Ukrainian Football Amateur League
 2008–09 Ukrainian Cup

External links
 2008 Ukrainian Amateur Cup at the Footpass (Football Federation of Ukraine)

2008
Amateur Cup
Ukrainian Amateur Cup, 2008